Kujata may refer to:

 Kujata (mythology), a bull said to be resting on the head of Bahamut in Arabian mythology
 Kiatak (Northumberland Island), Greenland